The 2023 iHeartRadio Music Awards will be held at the Dolby Theatre in Los Angeles on March 27, 2023, and broadcast live on Fox.

Performances
Performers were announced on March 7, 2023.

Nominees
iHeartRadio announced the nominees on January 11, 2023. Harry Styles and Taylor Swift were the most nominated artists, with eight nominations each. Drake, Dua Lipa and Jack Harlow received six nominations apiece, while Beyoncé and Doja Cat all tied with five.

References

2023
2023 music awards
2023 in Los Angeles
2023 awards in the United States
March 2023 events in the United States